Draba hispida, the three-toothed whitlow grass, is a species of plant in the family Brassicaceae.

Description
Draba hispida is a perennial plant, with a basal rosette of obovate hairy leaves. The erect stems carry a small number of yellow flowers

Distribution
This species is native to Asia Minor (north-eastern Turkey, Central Anatolia Region and Caucasus Mountains).

References

hispida